Brassfield Baptist Church is a historic Baptist church located near Wilton, Granville County, North Carolina. Brassfield Baptist Church was constituted on August 23, 1823, by elders Zachariah Allen, James Weathers and William Worrel.  The current historical building was constructed about 1843, and is a two-story, heavy timber frame, Greek Revival-style church building.  Also on the property is the contributing church cemetery.

It was listed on the National Register of Historic Places in 1988.

References

External links
 Church Website

Baptist churches in North Carolina
Churches on the National Register of Historic Places in North Carolina
Greek Revival church buildings in North Carolina
Churches completed in 1843
19th-century Baptist churches in the United States
Churches in Granville County, North Carolina
National Register of Historic Places in Granville County, North Carolina
1843 establishments in North Carolina